The Futurians was a fictional superhero team appearing in American comic books published by Marvel Comics. The team was created by Dave Cockrum, and first appeared in 1983 in the ninth of the Marvel Graphic Novels series, then in a three-issue run published by Lodestone Comics.

In 2003, author Clifford Meth revamped the comic as a yet-to-be produced screenplay for IDT Entertainment.

Publication history
The characters first appeared in Marvel Graphic Novels #9, and the story continued in a three-issue limited series from Lodestone Comics. The series was reprinted by Eternity Comics in 1987, along with the material from an unpublished fourth issue. In 1995, a black-and-white version of the fourth issue material (along with the short story "Less Filling") was published, as issue #0, by Cockrum's own Aardwolf Publishing. In an inside-front cover essay that appeared in Futurians #0, Dave Cockrum explained:

A four-issue mini-series written and drawn by David Miller, with colors by Joe Rubenstein, focused on the character of Avatar and showed some of his history as he returned home to London and fought Morgan Le Fay. It was published in 2010 by David Miller Studios as Avatar of the Futurians, and collected as the trade paperback Dave Cockrum's Futurians: Avatar in 2011.

Plot
The premise was of an extremely advanced future society called the Terminus, who attempted to alter the past by sending genetic information back through time, to give certain human beings super-powers (and a compulsion to use them) in order to enable them to stop some unnamed disaster. In the late 20th Century, a future inhabitant known only as "Vandervecken" or "The Dutchman" (both names for The Flying Dutchman) downloaded his mind into the body of a hobo who later becomes the owner of the Future Dynamics corporation; Vandervecken then began gathering up those who had been empowered to begin preparing them for their historic battles.

Members
The main characters of The Futurians:
 Avatar: The first empowered human, when we first meet him he is, unknown to Vandervecken, already functionally immortal and has an intuitive ability, which allows him to make accurate predictions based on seemingly insufficient data. Vandervecken's process gives him the additional powers of flight, superstrength, and invulnerability. He also has over three thousand years of knowledge and experience in strategy and tactics.  He is the only Futurian to have overcome his genetic conditioning to obey Vandervecken. He has had many names and identities throughout the centuries, the most recent being Andrew Pendragon.
 Vandervecken: The mind of a future time traveller in the body of vagabond who later becomes a millionaire scientific genius. He has vast knowledge of future events and technology.
 Terrayne: Geologist Harry Robbins has become a living mud-man who can manipulate rock and earth. At first he is permanently trapped in this form, but Vandervecken supplies him with a ring that allows him to become human again.
 Silkie: Marine biologist Tracy Winters becomes a green-skinned amphibian with the ability to breathe underwater at great depths, fire bio-electrical blasts, control and shape water, and transform into a humanoid manta ray-like form, which allows her to fly or swim at great speeds.
 Werehawk: Matthew Blackfeather, an attorney for the Dakota Indian tribe, can turn into a clawed, flying hawk-like humanoid; however, when he does so, he can become overwhelmed by predatory instincts and a berserker rage. If he loses control entirely, he turns fully into a giant raptor bird.
 Silver Shadow: Ex-spy Jonathan Darknyte is able to become a living shadow, who can merge with, animate, or teleport through shadows and darkness.
 Mosquito: Dana Morgan gains the ability to fly and generate ultrasonic energy. She also carries a gun that fires anesthetic or explosive darts.
 Sunswift: A immortal fire elemental from Egypt, Neith can survive in space or in the Sun's corona where she currently resides, generate solar-temperature plasma, and fly at tremendous speeds. She is also the former lover of Andrew Pendragon from ancient times. Sunswift must shed a great deal of her power before she enters a planetary atmosphere for fear of accidentally destroying anything around her. But even after doing so, she is still a very formidable opponent.
 Blackmane: Walter Bonner becomes a lion-like being with razor-sharp talons and superhuman strength and agility.

Film adaptation
Clifford Meth, who wrote one Futurians story with Cockrum, has worked on the screenplay for the story which was optioned by IDT Entertainment and, after the rights reverted, he was in negotiation with Richard Saperstein, but that fell through as well.

In 2017, Deadpool co-creator Rob Liefeld optioned the property and said that he planned to revive Cockrum's Futurians. Clifford Meth, representing the Cockrum family and Dave Cockrum estate, commented: "Rob Liefeld is the perfect creator to take on this project. Rob is a fan-favorite storyteller whose personality, like Dave’s, is comics incarnate. He loves the medium, grew up on Dave’s work, and developed a number of his own extremely popular characters such as Deadpool and Cable. Rob will know exactly what to do with The Futurians and we can’t wait to see it".

References

External links
  Review in French 

 
 The Futurians at the International Catalogue of Superheroes

1986 comics endings
American comics titles
Comic book limited series
Eternity Comics titles
Marvel Comics graphic novels
Marvel Comics superhero teams
Characters created by Dave Cockrum